The Elkton Commercial Historic District, in Elkton, Kentucky, is a  historic district which was listed on the National Register of Historic Places in 1989.

It included 18 contributing buildings around the public square of Elkton, intersected by N., S., E., and W. Main Streets.  The buildings are "primarily one-to-two-story masonry structures with detailing and designs reflecting local interpretations of the Italianate and Colonial Revival commercial forms of the period. While the majority of the commercial buildings have altered storefronts, most retain original upper facade detailing. The public square is the commercial center of Elkton and Todd County."

These include:
Todd County Courthouse (1835), in the center of the square, built by local brickmason Jesse Russell.  This was already separately listed on the National Register.
13 Public Square (c.1895), a one-story, eight bay, brick and stone commercial building with twin storefronts having no original details.

References

National Register of Historic Places in Todd County, Kentucky
Federal architecture in Kentucky
Italianate architecture in Kentucky
Colonial Revival architecture in Kentucky
Buildings and structures completed in 1821
Commercial buildings on the National Register of Historic Places in Kentucky
Elkton, Kentucky